Jen Kao (born July 15, 1981) is an American fashion designer of Taiwanese ancestry.

Early life
Daughter of Garmin co-founder Min Kao, Jen Kao was born in Los Angeles and grew up on the Kansas side of the Kansas City Metropolitan Area, where she graduated from the Pembroke Hill School in 1999. Thereafter, she received a degree in studio art from New York University and then a graduate degree from Parsons School of Design.

Career
Kao's career began in 2007 when she debuted a spring collection at New York Fashion Week. Elle describes her designs as "art-inspired, intellectually approached, and meticulously executed." Her eponymous line is sold in New York City, Los Angeles, London, and Tokyo, in addition to various internet websites.  M.I.A., Elettra Wiedemann, Taylor Momsen, Nicki Minaj, Fergie, Robin Wright, Harley Viera-Newton, and Rachel McAdams have worn her designs.

Kao was inducted into the Council of Fashion Designers of America (CFDA) in 2011.

In September 2013, a company spokeswoman announced that Kao would be closing her ready-to-wear line indefinitely due to unspecified health problems.

References

External links
Jen Kao (official site)
Vogue.com reports on Jen Kao shows
Style.com reports on Jen Kao shows

1981 births
American people of Taiwanese descent
Living people
People from Los Angeles
People from Johnson County, Kansas
Steinhardt School of Culture, Education, and Human Development alumni
Parsons School of Design alumni
American fashion designers of Chinese descent
American fashion designers